Kathrin Entner (born 30 August 1988) is an Austrian football defender, currently playing for SV Neulengbach in the ÖFB-Frauenliga. She is a member of the Austrian national team.

References

1988 births
Living people
Austrian women's footballers
SV Neulengbach (women) players
Austria women's international footballers
USC Landhaus Wien players
Women's association football defenders
ÖFB-Frauenliga players